Graham Usher may refer to:

 Graham Usher (dancer) (1938–1975), ballet dancer with the Royal Ballet
 Graham Usher (bishop) (born 1970), Anglican bishop and ecologist
 Graham Usher (darts player) (born 1973), English professional darts player

See also
 Usher (surname)